St. Philip Catholic Central High School, located in the Roman Catholic Diocese of Kalamazoo, is a Roman Catholic high school in Battle Creek, Michigan.

Sports

The Fighting Tigers compete in Class D of the MHSAA. The school offers the following sports: baseball, boys' basketball, girls' basketball, boys' cross country, girls' cross country, football, boys' golf, boys' track, girls' track, volleyball, boys' and girls' swimming with Battle Creek Central, girls' soccer, and boys' soccer with Calhoun Christian.

St. Philip's is associated with the South Central Athletic Association (SCAA) beginning with the school year of (2009), transferring out of the Saint Joe Valley.

The most recent Class D state Titles came in girls' cross country (2006), and volleyball (2007-W, 2007-F, 2008, 2009, 2010, 2011, 2012, 2013, 2014, 2020).
St. Phillip Volleyball has appeared in the state finals a record 30 times and has won the state championship 21 times

Notable alumni
Don Kent, professional wrestler
Mike Reilly, Major League Baseball umpire
John C. Sheehan, organic chemist

References

https://www.mhsaa.com/Sports/Girls-Volleyball/Record-Book/Championship-Match-Records

External links
Official School website

Catholic secondary schools in Michigan
Battle Creek, Michigan
Educational institutions established in 1863
Schools in Calhoun County, Michigan
Roman Catholic Diocese of Kalamazoo
1863 establishments in Michigan